Killer Bash is a 2005 homoerotic television horror film directed by David DeCoteau.

External links

Interview with David Decoteau
Information about Killer Bash at Regent Entertainment

2005 horror films
2005 television films
Canadian LGBT-related television films
English-language Canadian films
Films directed by David DeCoteau
2005 LGBT-related films
LGBT-related horror films
2005 films
Canadian horror television films
2000s Canadian films